In telecommunications, insertion loss is the loss of signal power resulting from the insertion of a device in a transmission line or optical fiber and is usually expressed in decibels (dB).  

If the power transmitted to the load before insertion is PT and the power received by the load after insertion is PR, then the insertion loss in decibels is given by,

Electronic filters

Insertion loss is a figure of merit for an electronic filter and this data is generally specified with a filter.  Insertion loss is defined as a ratio of the signal level in a test configuration without the filter installed to the signal level with the filter installed .  This ratio is described in decibels by the following equation:

In this case, the insertion loss is positive and measures how much smaller the signal is after adding the filter.

Link with scattering parameters

In case the two measurement ports use the same reference impedance, the insertion loss is defined as: 

.

Here  is one of the scattering parameters. Insertion loss is the extra loss produced by the introduction of the DUT between the 2 reference planes of the measurement. The extra loss can be introduced by intrinsic loss in the DUT and/or mismatch. In case of extra loss the insertion loss is defined to be positive.

See also
 Mismatch loss
 Return loss

References

Telecommunications engineering
Engineering ratios